The Wilson Park Historic District (sometimes Rock House Historic District) is a historic district in Fayetteville, Arkansas, USA, located just northeast of the University of Arkansas. The district consists of several residential buildings that developed during the late 19th and early 20th Century near Wilson Park just north of Dickson Street, the city's primary entertainment district. Wilson Park Historic District includes 47 contributing buildings.

Location
The Wilson Park Historic District is located directly south of Wilson Park in Fayetteville north of the Fayetteville Historic Square and northeast of the University of Arkansas. It is bounded on the south by Maple Street and contains homes on both sides of Ila Street from Highland Avenue on the east and Vandeventer Avenue to the west. A few additional contributing properties are located along Davidson Street, along the eastern boundary of the district.

See also

Mount Nord Historic District
University of Arkansas Campus Historic District
West Dickson Street Commercial Historic District
National Register of Historic Places listings in Washington County, Arkansas

References

Historic districts on the National Register of Historic Places in Arkansas
Geography of Washington County, Arkansas
Fayetteville, Arkansas
National Register of Historic Places in Fayetteville, Arkansas